Ortlieb Sportartikel GmbH is a German manufacturer of outdoor equipment based in Heilsbronn, Germany, which specializes in waterproof bags. Ortlieb is a leading manufacturer of waterproof panniers for bicycles.

In addition to bicycle accessories, Ortlieb also produces outdoor, trekking and expedition equipment for water sports and motorcycles. Special shoulder bags and backpacks are offered for bicycle messengers.

History 
The company was founded in 1982 in Nuremberg by Hartmut Ortlieb in Germany. In 1997 the head office was moved to Heilsbronn in Middle Franconia, 25 km away.

The first products were hand-sewn panniers made from truck tarpaulins. Waterproof bags for bicycles did not exist until then.

The company makes more than 500 products and uses various different waterproof closure systems (zipper, hook-and-loop fastener and their typical roll closures). All products are guaranteed for five years and the seams of the goods are welded watertight.

References 

Sporting goods manufacturers of Germany
Cycle parts manufacturers
Luggage manufacturers
Luggage brands
Companies based in Bavaria
1982 establishments in West Germany